The Greeley Tribune Building is a historic building in Greeley, Colorado. It was built in 1929. It is home to the Greeley History Museum, and listed on the National Register of Historic Places.

History
The building was erected for The Greeley Tribune, the main newspaper in Greeley, in 1929. 

The building was purchased by the city of Greeley in 2003 to house a museum about the history of Greeley. It is now home to the Greeley History Museum and the Hazel E. Johnson Research Center.

Architectural significance
The building was designed by architects Sidney Frazier and Frank B. Anderson in the Beaux Arts style. It has been listed on the National Register of Historic Places since April 18, 2007.

References

Buildings and structures on the National Register of Historic Places in Colorado
National Register of Historic Places in Weld County, Colorado
Beaux-Arts architecture in Colorado
Buildings and structures completed in 1929
Museums in Weld County, Colorado
History museums in Colorado